Ishwar Manikya was briefly the Maharaja of Tripura at the close of the 16th century.

It is believed that in the aftermath of the death of Rajdhar Manikya I in 1600, some confusion arose in regards to the succession to the throne. Historian Jai Prakash Singh suggests that the inauspicious horoscope of the old king's heir, Yashodhar, made the nobility hesitant in accepting him as monarch. It was through such a situation that Ishwar, as well as another individual, Virabhadra Manikya, made bids for the throne, though the former appears to have been more successful.

His original name and relationship with the previous king are unknown. Among the possibilities is that he had been a brother of Yashodhar. Alternatively, he may have been Amaradurlabha, the younger brother of Rajdhar, who had been a distinguished veteran of the Arakan wars under Amar Manikya. Otherwise, he may have belonged to a collateral branch of the ruling dynasty.

There were coins minted in his name, though there is practically nothing known about him, with his name being omitted from the Rajmala, the Tripura royal chronicle. He was eventually ousted after a few months of rule in favour of Yashodhar, who had finally found backing from the nobility and formerly ascended the throne.

Notes

References

Kings of Tripura
History of Tripura
Dethroned monarchs